The M8 is a  long highway in the Nakhchivan Autonomous Republic or Azerbaijan. It begins in the city of Nakhchivan and runs southeast to the closed border with Armenia. It is the primary highway in the southeast of the exclave. The road continues into Armenia as the E002 for  until connecting to the M2 highway near Agarak.

Transportation in Nakhchivan
Roads in Azerbaijan